Aage Redal (27 May 1891 - 19 November 1950) was a Danish stage and film actor.

Selected filmography
 - 1925
 - 1926
Don Quixote - 1926
 Sun Over Denmark - 1936
 - 1938
 - 1939
 - 1940
 - 1940
 - 1941
 - 1941
Peter Andersen - 1941
 - 1944
 - 1944
 - 1944
 - 1944
 - 1945
 - 1949

External links

Danish male stage actors
Danish male film actors
Danish male silent film actors
20th-century Danish male actors
Male actors from Copenhagen
1891 births
1950 deaths